Ala Stanford is an American pediatric surgeon. She is the founder of R.E.A.L. Concierge Medicine and the Black Doctors COVID-19 Consortium. She is also the first African-American female pediatric surgeon to be trained entirely in the United States.

Early life and education
Stanford was born in Germantown, Philadelphia to a teenage mother. A few years later, her father went off to college while her mother worked, leaving Stanford in charge of her younger brother. Following high school, Stanford enrolled at Pennsylvania State University for her undergraduate degree and medical degree. Upon graduating from the Penn State University College of Medicine, Stanford finished her residency at SUNY Downstate Medical Center and the University of Pittsburgh Medical Center. Stanford subsequently became the first African-American female pediatric surgeon to be trained entirely in the United States.

Career
Following her fellowship at the Cincinnati Children's Hospital Medical Center, Stanford joined the faculty at Temple University in September 2006. A year later, she was promoted to director of the Center for Minority Health and Health Disparities at Temple University School of Medicine. In this role, Stanford partnered with Allegheny West Foundation to improve the quality of life for area residents. As a result of her efforts, Stanford was recognized with the Shirley Chisholm Award from the Philadelphia Congress of the National Congress of Black Women. She eventually left Temple University to become the director of pediatric surgery at Abington Memorial Hospital. While there, she completed life-saving surgery on a baby from Haiti. Through her hospital connections, Stanford also established Stanford Pediatric Surgery, LLC, It Takes Philly. Inc, and R.E.A.L Concierge Medicine.

During the start of the COVID-19 pandemic, Stanford recognized racism in medicine amongst the distribution of vaccines. As such, she left her role as a pediatric surgeon to work full time to address health disparities in Black communities during the pandemic. This led to the establishment of the Black Doctors COVID-19 Consortium (BDCC), which combined a group of around 200 healthcare professionals. By February 2021, Stanford and the BDCC had vaccinated nearly 4,000 people of marginalized areas. She was also recruited by Philadelphia sports teams, such as the Philadelphia Flyers, to encourage fans to get vaccinated. As a result of her efforts, she was recognized by Forbes magazine as a woman over the age of 50 who was changing the world. Stanford was also named one of Fortune Magazines 50 Greatest Leaders and recognized by CNN as a Top 10 hero.

In October 2021, Stanford opened the Ala Stanford Center for Health Equity to offer primary care and behavioral health services to adults and children in North Philadelphia. Later that month, she also rescinded her name from consideration to be Philadelphia's next health commissioner.

Awards and honors 

 The Shirley Chisholm Award from the Philadelphia Congress of the National Congress of Black Women in 2018
 The Philadelphia Award in 2021
 The Harris Wofford Active Citizenship Award in 2021 for her work fighting COVID-19
 The 2021 Dare to Understand award
 USA Today's Women of the Year for 2022

Personal life
Stanford married Byron Drayton on March 30, 2020.

References

Living people
African-American women physicians
American pediatric surgeons
Temple University faculty
Pennsylvania State University alumni
Physicians from Philadelphia
21st-century American physicians
Year of birth missing (living people)